Nijat Shikhalizade (born 12 October 1988) is an Azerbaijani judoka.

In 2021, he won one of the bronze medals in his event at the 2021 Judo Grand Slam Antalya held in Antalya, Turkey.

Achievements

References

External links

 
 

1988 births
Living people
Azerbaijani male judoka
Judoka at the 2016 Summer Olympics
Olympic judoka of Azerbaijan
European Games competitors for Azerbaijan
Judoka at the 2015 European Games
Judoka at the 2019 European Games
Islamic Solidarity Games medalists in judo
20th-century Azerbaijani people
21st-century Azerbaijani people